Ray Sasaki (born October 22, 1948) is an American trumpeter. He was Professor of Trumpet at the University of Texas at Austin, until his retirement in 2018, and a member of the St. Louis Brass Quintet. Sasaki is also one of the founding members of the Tone Road Ramblers, a composer/performer collective ensemble started in 1981 in New York City. He was previously on the faculty of the University of Illinois.

References 

American trumpeters
American male trumpeters
University of North Texas College of Music alumni
Texas classical music
Living people
1948 births
21st-century trumpeters
21st-century American male musicians